On 8 December 2008, the Genocide Prevention Task Force, co-chaired by Madeleine Albright, a former US Secretary of State, and William Cohen, a former US Secretary of Defense, released its final report which concludes that the US government can prevent genocide and mass atrocities in the future.

In the words of Cohen, "This report provides a blueprint that can enable the United States to take preventive action, along with international partners, to forestall the specter of future cases of genocide and mass atrocities."

Recommendations include:
a proactive role of the US president which would demonstrate to the US and the world that preventing genocide and mass atrocities is a national priority
creating a body within the United States National Security Council to analyze threats and consider preventive action
set up a fund of $250 million  for crisis prevention and response
help create an international network for the sharing of information and the coordination of preventive action

References

Genocide prevention
Agencies of the United States government
Genocide research and prevention organisations
2008 documents
Reports of the United States government
2008 in international relations
2008 in American politics